Underground Resistance (commonly abbreviated to UR) are an American musical collective from Detroit, Michigan. Producing primarily Detroit techno since 1990 with a grungy four-track musical aesthetic, they are also renowned for their militant political and anti-corporate ethos.

History
First formed in 1989 by "Mad" Mike Banks and Jeff Mills. UR related the aesthetics of early Detroit Techno to the social, political, and economic circumstances which followed on from Reagan-era inner-city economic recession, producing uncompromising music geared toward promoting awareness and facilitating political change. In contrast to techno that preceded UR, UR tried to appeal to lower class African Americans in Detroit. UR's tracks created a sense of self-exploration, experimentation and the ability to change yourself and circumstances. Additionally, UR wanted to establish a means of identification beyond traditional lines of race and ethnicity. By targeting lower class African Americans, UR intended to inspire black men to get out of the poverty cycle in the city. It was about providing new ways for lower class African Americans to form their identities. The Underground Resistance's politics extended to providing alternative identities to inner city African American youth, other than the hyper-masculine, hard and violent identities existing within the city. This was a gendered group, however, and the UR focused their attention on young black men. Another form of UR's rebellion concerns the rejection of the commercialization of techno. This is evident in the messages scratched in UR vinyl, lyrics and sounds expressing economic independence from major record labels.

As with Public Enemy, there have been intimations that UR's subversively 'militant' approach to music was related to the activities of the Black Panthers in the 1970s. Mills in a 2006 interview responds to that claim: "All the black men you see in America today are the direct result of those actions: all the freedoms we have, as well as the restrictions, refer back to the government and the Black Panthers in the '70s". Mills continues: "So we make music. We make music about who we are and where we’re from. Of course there are going to be links – that's why we had songs with titles like Riot. Because that's indicative of the era we were born in, and the things we remember. As time goes on, naturally I think the messages will get further away from that. It's not a coincidence. There is a reason behind UR and Public Enemy and these people."

Many of UR's earliest output would be the product of various experiments by Banks, Mills, and Hood - both solo and in collaboration. "The Theory" and "Eye Of The Storm" (Sonic EP) were among the two earliest UR tracks to be released in 1990, followed by a stream of EPs and singles including "Riot", "Acid Rain", and "Jupiter Jazz". The trio also recorded under the aliases X-101 and X-102, releasing both EPs such a "Sonic Destroyer" and "Groundzero (The Planet)" and the albums "X-101" and "X-102 Discovers The Rings of Saturn".

When Mills and Hood moved on from the collective in 1992 to achieve international success as solo artists and DJs, Banks continued to lead UR releasing EPs during the mid-1990s such as "Return of Acid Rain", "Message to the Majors", and excursions into Nu Jazz on "Hi-Tech Jazz" as Galaxy 2 Galaxy. Increasingly acclaimed artists such as DJ Rolando, Suburban Knight, and Drexciya also joined the collective.

1998's "Interstellar Fugitives", the first full album credited to Underground Resistance, saw Mike Banks redefining the collective's sound as "High-Tech Funk", reflecting a shift in emphasis from hard, minimal club Techno to breakbeats, Electro and even occasionally Drum and Bass and down-tempo Hip-Hop.

In 2014, UR took part in a lecture and discussion at New York's Museum of Modern Art.

Conflict with Sony BMG 
In 1999, DJ Rolando released UR's most commercially successful EP, "The Knights of The Jaguar". Legal and conceptual ownership of the track became the subject of a battle between UR and Sony BMG, the details of which are contested.

Sony claimed in subsequent statements that they first tried to contact UR to license the EP for release in Germany, recognizing the potential for a crossover hit. Receiving no response, they instead commissioned and released a trance cover version of the original, "tone-for-tone", which was released as a promo. For their part, UR denies that they ever received a request from Sony to license the track.

Founding member "Mad" Mike denounced the release, arguing that it did not constitute a legitimate cover as it was intended to profit from rather than offer tribute to the group. When confronted, Sony justified its actions by stating they intended to credit Rolando as the composer of the work and grant him royalties on its sale.

Although the group initially suggested they might pursue legal action, they instead conducted a direct action campaign against the label. "Mad" Mike described the strategy as a conceptual rejection of the justice system and its legitimacy. Fans were encouraged to boycott the release and contact record stores and the labels themselves with messages of protest. Some fans reported vandalizing or destroying copies in record stores.

Due to the negative attention directed against the label, Sony voluntarily withdrew the release, citing a desire to avoid further damaging their relationship with the musical underground. The dispute ultimately contributed to the international popularity of the original UR release, which became seen as symbolic of the group's independence and anti-corporate stance.

Rolando departed the collective in 2004.

Discography

Albums
 X-101 (1991 - as X-101)
 X-102 - Discovers The Rings Of Saturn (1992 - as X-102)
 Interstellar Fugitives (1998)
 Interstellar Fugitives 2 - Destruction Of Order (2005)

Compilations
 Revolution For Change (1991)
 A Hi-tech Jazz Compilation (2005 - as Galaxy 2 Galaxy)

Singles/EPs
 The Theory (1990 - appeared on the Equinox Chapter One EP)
 Sonic EP (1990)
 Your Time Is Up (1990 - With Yolanda)
 Punisher (1991)
 Riot EP (1991)
 Waveform E.P. (1991)
 The Final Frontier (1991)
 Living For The Nite (1991 - With Yolanda)
 Elimination/Gamma-Ray (1991)
 Nation 2 Nation (1991)
 Fuel For The Fire - Attend The Riot (1991)
 Sonic Destroyer (1991 - as X-101)
 Groundzero / The Rings Of Saturn (1991 - as X-102)
 The Seawolf (1992)
 Fury (1992)
 World 2 World (1992)
 Message To The Majors (1992)
 Belgian Resistance (1992)
 Acid Rain EP (1992)
 Panic EP (1992)
 Piranha (1992)
 Kamikaze (1992)
 The Return Of Acid Rain - The Storm Continues (1993)
 Acid Rain III - Meteor Shower (1993)
 Dark Energy (1994)
 Electronic Warfare (1995)
 Soundpictures EP (1995)
 Electronic Warfare - Designs For Sonic Revolutions (1996)
 Ambush (1997)
 The Turning Point (1997)
 The Infiltraitor (1997)
 Codebreaker (1997)
 Radioactive Rhythms (1997)
 Knights Of The Jaguar EP (1998)
 Hardlife (2001)
 Millennium To Millennium (2001)
 Illuminator (2002)
 The Analog Assassin (2002)
 Inspiration/Transition (2002)
 Actuator (2003)
 Transition/Windchime (2003)
 Ma Ya Ya (2004)
 Interstellar Fugitives 2 - The Destruction Of Order (2006)
 Footwars (2007)
 Electronic Warfare 2.0 (2007)
 Electronic Warfare 2.1 (2007)
 This Is What Happens (2009)
 Somewhere In Japan EP (2010)

Remixes
 1991 Digital Boy – "This Is Mutha F**ker!"
 1991 The Reese Project – "Direct Me"
 1992 Bass Probe – "Mind Experiments"
 1992 Chez Damier – "Can You Feel It"
 1992 Ingator II – "Skyscratch (Mano Mano)"
 1992 Maurizio – "Ploy"
 1992 The Reese Project – "The Colour of Love"
 1993 Seven Grand Housing Authority – "The Question"
 1997 Rashid Salaam – "'D' Old Skool Dances"
 2000 Kraftwerk – "Expo 2000"
 2002 Model 600 – "Update"
 2006 Depeche Mode – "People Are People"
 2007 Commix - "Satellite Song"
 2008 Anthony Rother – "When The Sun Goes Down"
 2010 Soul Designer – "The Soul Is Back"
 2010 Randolph - "GPS"
 2013 Robert Hood - "Black Technician"
 2015 Esteban Adame - "Rise & Shine"
 2017 Funkadelic - "Music 4 My Mother"
 2018 Radio Slave – "Trans"
 2022 Waajeed – "Motor City Madness"

See also
 Detroit techno
 List of record labels

References

External links
 – official site

American techno music groups
Electronic music groups from Michigan
American record labels
Techno record labels
Record labels established in 1989
Musical groups from Detroit
Musical collectives
Rhythm King artists